Alla Belinska (born 8 October 1995) is a Ukrainian freestyle wrestler. She is a gold medalist at the European Wrestling Championships. She represented Ukraine at the 2020 Summer Olympics in Tokyo, Japan.

Career 

In one of her first senior-level competitions, she competed at the World Olympic Qualification Tournament held in Ulaanbaatar, Mongolia hoping to qualify for the 2016 Summer Olympics in Rio de Janeiro, Brazil. She was no longer able to qualify after losing her first match against María Acosta of Venezuela. In 2017, she lost her bronze medal match at the 2017 European U23 Wrestling Championships held in Szombathely, Hungary. In that same year, she was eliminated in her first match in the women's 69 kg event at the 2017 World Wrestling Championships held in Paris, France.

In 2018, she won the bronze medal in the women's 68 kg event at the European U23 Wrestling Championship held in Istanbul, Turkey. She also competed in the women's 72 kg event at the World Wrestling Championships held in Budapest, Hungary.

In 2019, she represented Ukraine in the women's 76 kg event at the European Games in Minsk, Belarus. She was eliminated in her second match by eventual bronze medalist Epp Mäe of Estonia. A few months later, she competed in the women's 76 kg event at the World Wrestling Championships held in Nur-Sultan, Kazakhstan. She also represented Ukraine at the Military World Games held in Wuhan, China and she won one of the bronze medals in the 76 kg event. In the same year, she also competed in the women's freestyle competition of the 2019 Wrestling World Cup.

In 2020, she won one of the bronze medals in the women's 72 kg event at the Individual Wrestling World Cup held in Belgrade, Serbia. In March 2021, she competed at the European Qualification Tournament in Budapest, Hungary hoping to qualify for the 2020 Summer Olympics in Tokyo, Japan. She did not qualify as she lost her match in the quarterfinals against Vasilisa Marzaliuk of Belarus. A month later, she won the gold medal in the 72 kg event at the European Wrestling Championships held in Warsaw, Poland. She defeated Yuliana Yaneva of Bulgaria in the final. In May 2021, she qualified at the World Olympic Qualification Tournament to represent Ukraine at the 2020 Summer Olympics. A month later, she won the gold medal in her event at the 2021 Poland Open held in Warsaw, Poland.

She competed in the women's 76 kg event at the 2020 Summer Olympics held in Tokyo, Japan. She was eliminated in her first match by eventual bronze medalist Zhou Qian of China. Two months after the Olympics, she was eliminated in her first match in the women's 72 kg event at the 2021 World Wrestling Championships held in Oslo, Norway. Her opponent Anna Schell of Germany went on to win one of the bronze medals.

She won one of the bronze medals in the women's 68 kg event at the 2022 European Wrestling Championships held in Budapest, Hungary. A few months later, she won the gold medal in her event at the Matteo Pellicone Ranking Series 2022 held in Rome, Italy. She competed in the 68 kg event at the 2022 World Wrestling Championships held in Belgrade, Serbia.

She won one of the bronze medals in her event at the 2023 Ibrahim Moustafa Tournament held in Alexandria, Egypt.

Achievements

References

External links 

 
 
 

1995 births
Living people
Place of birth missing (living people)
Ukrainian female sport wrestlers
European Wrestling Championships medalists
Wrestlers at the 2019 European Games
European Games competitors for Ukraine
Wrestlers at the 2020 Summer Olympics
Olympic wrestlers of Ukraine
European Wrestling Champions
21st-century Ukrainian women